Bernardo Yorba (August 20, 1800 – November 28, 1858), was a prominent Californio landowner, public figure, and one of the wealthiest men in early 19th-century California. Yorba also served as alcalde (mayor) of Santa Ana. The city of Yorba Linda is named after him.

Born to José Antonio Yorba, a member of the Portolà expedition, Yorba was one of California's largest landowners and most successful ranchers, with thousands of cattle and horses grazing on land grants totaling more than 35,000 acres. Bernado Yorba managed his holdings from the Hacienda de San Antonio, the principal hacienda of the Yorba family.

Life
Bernardo Yorba was born on August 20, 1800 in San Diego. Other sources list his birth on August 4, 1801. Bernardo was the son of José Antonio Yorba, one of the first Spanish soldiers to arrive in California, and Maria Josefa Grijalva. Bernardo's childhood was spent in San Diego, where he attended a school kept by Franciscan Fathers. Jose Antonio Yorba had moved to the Rancho Santiago de Santa Ana, granted to him and his nephew Pablo Peralta, by Governor José Joaquín de Arrillaga on behalf of the Spanish Government in 1810. It was around this time that the family moved to the rancho near present-day Olive, California in Orange County.

In 1834, Bernardo was granted the  Rancho Cañón de Santa Ana. It was shortly after this that Bernardo began construction of a large adobe house, the Bernardo Yorba Hacienda. Bernardo was elected to serve as Juez de Campo and Auxiliary Alcade several times (1833, 1836, 1840, and 1844). In 1846, he was granted Rancho La Sierra.

Descendants
In 1858, At the age of 58, Bernardo Yorba died leaving behind a large and prosperous rancho and many children. Some sources list his death on November 28, 1858. Other sources list his death on October 21, 1858. He was interred in the old Calvary Cemetery in Los Angeles. He left the land for a cemetery, the Yorba Cemetery, in his will but it was not ready for a burial until 1862. He and nine of his family members remained at Calvary until 1923 when they were all moved and reinterred at Yorba Cemetery. He married his first wife, Maria de Jesus Alvarado, in 1819. After her death, he married Felipa Dominguez in 1829, and after her death, Andrea Elizalde (Davila) in 1854.

References

Further reading
Beers, Henry Putney, (1979). "Spanish & Mexican Records of the American Southwest : A Bibliographical Guide to Archive and Manuscript Sources", Tucson : University of Arizona Press
Mildred Yorba MacArthur, A brief history of the Yorba family, Yorba Linda Public Library, May 1960.
Newmark, Haris (1916) Sixty Years in Southern California: 1853–1913, Knickerbocker Press, New York.

Pleasants, Adelene (1931). "History of Orange County, California. Vol. 1", Los Angeles, CA : J. R. Finnell & Sons Publishing Company

External links
Yorba Linda History
The Yorba and Slaughter Families Adobe

Californios
1801 births
1858 deaths
American landowners
American cattlemen